Johnathan Dalton (born 9 June 1996) is an Australian cricketer. He made his first-class debut for South Australia in the 2016–17 Sheffield Shield season on 16 March 2017.

Domestic career

2015–16 season

Dalton played for South Australia Under-23s in three matches in the 2015–16 Futures League, scoring 192 runs at an average of 32.00. His high score of 92 came against Victoria Under-23s in the final match of the tournament.

2016–17 season

He continued for South Australia in the Futures League in the 2016–17 season and his form improved, averaging 45.50. He scored twin centuries, 104 and 100 not out, against Victoria. He got the opportunity to play against the touring South African side in a tour match for a South Australia second XI. He scored 20 runs before he was run-out.

His form was good enough to be rewarded with his first-class debut at the end of the season. He played in a Sheffield Shield match against Tasmania. He opened the batting, scoring 40 runs in the first innings and 71 in the second. As South Australia won the match, they progressed to the final against Victoria, which Dalton also played in. He again opened the batting, but this time he was bowled by James Pattinson on the third ball of South Australia’s first innings.

2017–18 season

Dalton earned his first contract with South Australia ahead of the 2017–18 season.

References

External links
 

1996 births
Living people
Australian cricketers
Place of birth missing (living people)
South Australia cricketers